IP or Ip or ip may refer to:

Businesses and organizations
 IP College (Indraprastha College for Women), a constituent college of the University of Delhi, New Delhi, India
 Imperial Police, a former Indian police agency
 International Paper, an American pulp and paper company
 Iraqi Police
 Atyrau Airways (IATA code: IP)
 Inicjatywa Pracownicza (Workers' Initiative), a Polish trade union

Places
 IP postcode area, for Ipswich and surrounding areas, England
 Ip, Sălaj, Romania
 Ip (river), a river in Sălaj County, Romania
 IP Casino Resort Spa, in Biloxi, Mississippi, US

Science and technology

Biology and medicine
 Immunoprecipitation, a molecular biology technique
 Incontinentia pigmenti, a genetic disorder
 Infundibulopelvic ligament, part of the female pelvis
 Interphalangeal joint (disambiguation)
 Interventional pulmonology, a less invasive lung treatment than surgery
 Intestinal permeability
 Intraperitoneal injection (IP injection), the injection of a substance into the peritoneum
 Prostacyclin receptor (symbol PTGIR, older synonym IP)

Computing
 Internet Protocol, a set of rules for sending data across a network
 IP address, a numerical label assigned to each device connected to a computer network
 IP (complexity), a class in computational complexity theory
 IP core (intellectual property core), a reusable design unit owned by one party
 Instruction pointer, a processor register
 Intelligent Peripheral, a part of a public telecommunications Intelligent Network
 Image processing
 ip, a Linux command in the iproute2 collection

Other science and technology
 IP Code (Ingress Protection code), an equipment protection classification scheme
 Identified patient, a psychology term
 Identity preserved, an agricultural designation
 Induced polarization, a geophysical imaging technique
 Intercept point, a measure in amplifiers and mixers
 Ion plating, a chemical process

Law and government
 Intellectual property, creations of the mind for which exclusive legal rights are recognized
 Industrial property, similar to intellectual property but including trademarks and excluding artistic copyright
 Insolvency practitioner, a legal specialist
 Industrial policy, a country's effort to encourage the development of certain sectors of the economy
 Integrated project (EU), a type of research project
 Immunity passport
 I/P, sometimes used as shorthand for the Israeli–Palestinian conflict

Other uses
 Ip (cuneiform)
 Ip (surname)
 Inflectional phrase, a functional phrase that has inflectional properties
 Innings pitched, a baseball statistic
 Integrated Programme, an academic scheme in Singapore
 Internationale Politik, a German political journal
 Item and Process, a linguistic method to describe phenomena of allomorphy

See also
 IP in IP, an IP tunneling protocol
 List of IP version numbers
 Ip Man (disambiguation)
 
 IP3 (disambiguation)
 IP5 (disambiguation)
 Independence Party (disambiguation)
 Independent Party (disambiguation)